Chahardangeh District is a district (bakhsh) in Sari County, Mazandaran Province, Iran. At the 2006 census, its population was 19,969, in 5,149 families.  The District has one city: Kiasar. The District has three rural districts (dehestan): Chahardangeh Rural District, Garmab Rural District, and Poshtkuh Rural District.

References 

Sari County
Districts of Mazandaran Province